Ananke is the Greek goddess of fate. Ananke may also refer to:

Ananke (moon), a moon of Jupiter
Ananke group, a group of satellites of Jupiter that follow similar orbits to Ananke
"Ananke", a short story by Stanisław Lem from Tales of Pirx the Pilot
Cosmopterix ananke, a moth of family Cosmopterigidae